Barki  is a village in the administrative district of Gmina Cyców, within Łęczna County, Lublin Voivodeship, in eastern Poland.

The village has a population of 290. It is home to mixed martial artist light heavyweight Michał Oleksiejczuk.

References

Villages in Łęczna County